Sociedad Cultural Recreativa Peña Deportiva is a Spanish football team based in Santa Eulària des Riu, in the autonomous community of Balearic Islands. According to its Fundational Act Peña Deportiva was founded on March 21, 1935.  It plays in Segunda División B – Group 1, holding home matches at Estadio Municipal de Santa Eulària des Riu, with a capacity of 1,500 seats.

History

Peña Deportiva was founded in 1935, but didn't start to compete until 1949. Deportiva only played in the regional leagues until 1985, when the club were promoted to Tercera Division for the first time. Deportiva played there for 8 seasons, before reaching Segunda Division B for the first time in 1993. However, the club lasted one season before they were relegated.

Peña returned to Segunda B in 2008, but they were again relegated after just one season. They remained in Tercera Division until 2017, when they again managed to reach the third tier. However, relegation followed again after the end of the season.

Season to season

5 seasons in Segunda División B
1 season in Segunda División RFEF
31 seasons in Tercera División

Current squad

Notable former players
 Fernando Silva
 Ángel Guirado

Notable coaches
 Lluís Elcacho
 Cristóbal Parralo

References

External links
Official website
FFIB team profile 
Club & stadium history 

 
Sport in Ibiza
Association football clubs established in 1949
1949 establishments in Spain
Santa Eulària des Riu